Karolina Nowak (born November 1, 1999) is a Polish female acrobatic gymnast. With partners Marta Srutwa and Agnieszka Rawinis, Nowak competed in the 2014 Acrobatic Gymnastics World Championships.

References

1999 births
Living people
Polish acrobatic gymnasts
Female acrobatic gymnasts
Place of birth missing (living people)